The 2017 Latrobe City Traralgon ATP Challenger was a professional tennis tournament played on outdoor hard court. It was the sixth edition of the tournament which was part of the 2017 ATP Challenger Tour. It took place in Traralgon, Australia between 23–29 October 2017.

Singles main draw entrants

Seeds

 Rankings are as of 16 October 2017.

Other entrants
The following players received wildcards into the singles main draw:
  Matthew Dellavedova
  Blake Ellis
  Jacob Grills
  Benjamin Mitchell

The following players received entry into the singles main using with a protected ranking:
  Andrew Harris
  Dane Propoggia

The following player received entry into the singles main draw as an alternate:
  Christopher O'Connell

The following players received entry from the qualifying draw:
  Jason Kubler
  Lucas Miedler
  Gavin van Peperzeel
  Sem Verbeek

Champions

Singles

  Jason Kubler def.  Alex Bolt 2–6, 7–6(8–6), 7–6(7–3).

Doubles

  Alex Bolt /  Bradley Mousley def.  Evan King /  Nathan Pasha 6–4, 6–2.

References

External links
 Official website

Latrobe City Traralgon ATP Challenger
2017 in Australian sport
2017